Spaulding High School is a public co-educational high school in Rochester, New Hampshire, United States. It is part of the city of Rochester School Department and is located at 130 Wakefield Street. Spaulding High School was built in 1939, and the addition of the Richard W. Creteau Center was completed in 1990. Along with the addition in 1990, the original building was extensively renovated.

The school has a student population of more than 1,500 students in grades 9–12. Students are offered a broad curriculum, with a strong focus on high academic standards in all areas. Academics are complemented by a full range of extracurricular activities including drama, sports, music, and vocational clubs and planned social events.

Spaulding is accredited by the New England Association of Schools and Colleges and is approved by the New Hampshire Department of Education.

Spaulding's mascot is the Red Raider. In 2015 the mascot came under public scrutiny for being an offensive portrayal of Native Americans, and in 2020 the Rochester-based group Allies United for Change urged the high school to change the mascot.

References

External links
Official website

1939 establishments in New Hampshire
Educational institutions established in 1939
Public high schools in New Hampshire
Rochester, New Hampshire
School buildings completed in 1939
Schools in Strafford County, New Hampshire